Cape Sandy is an unincorporated community in Ohio Township, Crawford County, Indiana.

History
A post office was established at Cape Sandy in 1877, and remained in operation until it was discontinued in 1965.

Geography

References

See also
List of cities and towns along the Ohio River

Unincorporated communities in Crawford County, Indiana
Unincorporated communities in Indiana